Marc Berthod (born 24 November 1983 in Saint-Moritz) is a retired Swiss alpine skier.

In 2005, he was Swiss champion in giant slalom. He finished 7th in the combined event at the 2006 Winter Olympics. On 7 January 2007, Berthod won the world cup slalom in Adelboden in a "miraculous" effort that saw him qualify in 27th position for the second run (an impressive performance in itself as he started at #60) and then proceeded to win with a second run that carried him all the way into 1st place, beating Olympic champion Benjamin Raich by 0.26 seconds.  The 2007 season has also yielded other good results for Berthod, with two other podium finishes so far, with a 2nd place at the Beaver Creek alpine combined, and a 2nd place in Wengen also in the combined.

In September 2016 he declared his retirement, as he lacked motivation and suffered several injuries in the past.

Race podiums

 2 wins – (1 SL, 1 GS)
 5 podiums – (1 SL, 2 GS, 2 AC)

Season standings

External links
Official website

1983 births
Swiss male alpine skiers
Alpine skiers at the 2006 Winter Olympics
Alpine skiers at the 2010 Winter Olympics
Olympic alpine skiers of Switzerland
Living people
21st-century Swiss people